Deutsche Pfandbriefbank AG is a German bank that specialises in real estate and public sector financing. As of 2016, it is a constituent of the SDAX trading index of German small-cap companies. It is based in Garching in Bayern, a suburb of Munich. Pfandbriefe is a German term for bonds issued in property financing.

PBB was a part of Hypo Real Estate (HRE), which was nationalised by the German government during the 2008 financial crisis. It was spun off in 2015 under EU rules on state aid to banks. It was rated by Moody's up to June 2015.

In May 2018, the German state – through HRE – placed around 22 million shares in PBB with institutional investors for 12.95 euros apiece in an accelerated bookbuilding; the sale raised around 287 million euros ($339.7 million) and slashed its stake in PBB to 3.5 percent from 20 percent. German public sector trust RAG Foundation bought a 4.5 percent stake.

References

External links
  (English)
 Financial Times
 Bloomberg
 

Banks of Germany
Companies listed on the Frankfurt Stock Exchange
Companies based in Bavaria
Banks under direct supervision of the European Central Bank
Companies based in Upper Bavaria
Munich (district)